Turová is a village and municipality of the Zvolen District in the Banská Bystrica Region of Slovakia.

Villages and municipalities in Zvolen District